The 1999 Pepsi 400 presented by Meijer was a NASCAR Winston Cup Series race that took place on August 22, 1999, at Michigan Speedway in Brooklyn, Michigan. This was the twenty-second race in the 1999 NASCAR Winston Cup Series schedule.

Background 
The Michigan Speedway is a 2-mile tri-oval built in 1969.  The frontstretch is 3,600 feet while the backstretch is 2,242 feet.  The track features 18 degrees in the corners, 12 degrees in the frontstretch, and 5 degrees in the backstretch.

Ernie Irvan suffered head and lung injuries in a Busch Series practice session the previous day.  His #36 M&Ms Pontiac was relieved by Dick Trickle for this race.  Ernie would later announce his retirement from racing two weeks later.

Future 2000 Winston Cup rookies and then-Busch Series championship contenders Dale Earnhardt, Jr. and Matt Kenseth made one of their pre-rookie season starts in this race.

Entry list

Qualifying 

Failed to qualify: Derrike Cope (#30), Stanton Barrett (#90), Darrell Waltrip (#66), Brett Bodine (#11), Tom Hubert (#19)

Race recap 
The race was very competitive with 24 lead changes among 11 drivers.  Many underdog drivers ran very well throughout the race, including Chad Little, Jimmy Spencer, and the underfunded Hut Stricklin in the unsponsored SBIII Motorsports Ford. It was the only top 10 for the SBIII team.

The final 20 laps featured a fierce battle between the sport's then-current stars of Bobby Labonte, Dale Earnhardt, Tony Stewart, Dale Jarrett, and Jeff Gordon.  At the end, it was Bobby Labonte who prevailed with his third win at Michigan and fourth of the 1999 season.

Timeline 

 Start:  Ward Burton leads the field to the green flag.
 Lap 48:  First caution is out for debris on pit road.  The outside pole-sitter Mike Skinner broke a pinion gear while trying to leave his pit box during the first caution flag stop of the day.
 Lap 54:  The pole-sitter Ward Burton got loose underneath Bobby Labonte and crashed hard into turn 3, causing the second caution.
 Lap 130:  Robert Pressley crashed in turn 4, causing the third caution.
 Lap 141:  Metal debris spotted in turn 1 causes the fourth caution.
 Lap 150:  Dick Trickle, Ricky Rudd, and Kevin Lepage crashed in the frontstretch, causing the fifth caution.
 Lap 163:  Tony Stewart made a move on Jeff Burton, made contact when coming up the track on the frontstretch, and sent Jeff Burton into the wall, causing the sixth caution.
 Lap 184:  Bobby Labonte took the lead for the final time after a fierce battle with Dale Earnhardt and Jeff Gordon.
 Lap 200:  Bobby Labonte takes the checkered flag.

Results

Post-Race Championship Standings

References 

1999 NASCAR Winston Cup Series
NASCAR races at Michigan International Speedway
1999 in sports in Michigan